Mary Stott  (born Charlotte Mary Waddington) (18 July 1907 – 16 September 2002) was a British feminist and journalist. She was editor of The Guardian newspaper's women's page between 1957 and 1972.Charlotte Mary Waddington was born in Leicester, the only daughter and third child of Robert Guy Waddington and his wife, born Amalie Bates. Robert and Amalie Waddington were both journalists.  In 1937, she married Ken Stott, who was a journalist for the News Chronicle.

In November 2005 she was posthumously included (one of just five women) in the Press Gazette's 40-strong 'gallery' of most influential British journalists.

Archives
Papers of Charlotte Mary Stott are held at The Women's Library at the Library of the London School of Economics, ref  7CMS

References

 Sources 
BBC Radio 4 programme on Mary Stott - listen online: http://www.bbc.co.uk/programmes/b00xpp68
Lena Jeger, Obituary - Mary Stott, The Guardian, 18 September 2002.
M. Stott, 1975, Forgetting's No Excuse (London, Virago).
M. Stott, 1985, Before I go''. (Autobiography part 2)
Elanor Mills With Kira Cochrane, "Cupcakes and Kalashnikovs"

English journalists
English feminists
People from Leicester
1907 births
2002 deaths
The Guardian journalists
Officers of the Order of the British Empire
Place of death missing
Social Democratic Party (UK) politicians
Women's page journalists